This article contains information about the literary events and publications of 1585.

Events
February 2 – Hamnet and Judith, twin children of William Shakespeare and his wife Anne, are baptised at Stratford-upon-Avon.
March 3 – The Teatro Olimpico, Vicenza, designed by Andrea Palladio, and completed by Vincenzo Scamozzi, opens with a production of Sophocles' Oedipus Rex), using trompe-l'œil scenery in one-point perspective.
December 13 – The blind poet, playwright and actor Luigi Groto dies in Venice, having just come from the theatre, where he has played the role of the blind Oedipus Rex.

New books

Prose
John Calvin – The Commentaries... upon the Actes of the Apostles, Faithfully translated out of Latine into English for the great profite of our countrie-men, by Christopher Fetherstone, student in divinitie 
Miguel de Cervantes – La Galatea

Drama
Nicolas de Montreux – Athlette
Richard Tarlton (attributed) – The Seven Deadly Sins

Poetry
See 1585 in poetry
Thomas Watson – Amyntas (pastoral epic in Latin)

Births
January 6 – Claude Favre de Vaugelas, French grammarian (died 1650)
January 31 – Daniel Schwenter, German Orientalist, polymath, poet and librarian (died 1636)
March 16 – Gerbrand Bredero, Dutch poet and playwright (died 1618)
June 24 – Johannes Lippius, German Protestant theologian, philosopher, and theorist of music (died 1612)
October 11 – Johann Heermann, German poet (died 1647)
December 4 – John Cotton, English-born American theologian and minister (died 1652)
December 13 – William Drummond of Hawthornden, Scottish poet (died 1649)

Uncertain dates
Elizabeth Cary, Lady Falkland, née Elizabeth Tanfield, English poet, translator and dramatist (died 1639)
Diego Jiménez de Enciso, Spanish dramatist (died 1634)

Deaths
January – Anthony Gilby, English Puritan and Bible translator (born c. 1510)
February 6 – Edmund Plowden, English lawyer and theorist (born 1518)
February 13 – Alfonso Salmeron, Spanish Jesuit Biblical commentator (born 1515)
March 10 – Rembert Dodoens, Flemish botanist (born 1517)
June 4 – Muretus, French humanist poet and writer in Latin (born 1526)
June 20 – Christian Kruik van Adrichem, Dutch Catholic theologian (born 1533)
July 30 – Christian Schesaus, German humanist poet (born 1535)
September 1 – Alexander Arbuthnot, Scottish printer (year of birth unknown)
September 18 – Molanus, Flemish theologian of the Counter Reformation (born 1533) 
December 8 – Piero Vettori, Italian humanist philologist and writer (born 1499)
December 27 – Pierre de Ronsard, French poet (born 1524)

References

Years of the 16th century in literature